There have been two baronetcies created for members of the Beckett family, both in the Baronetage of the United Kingdom. Both are extant as of 2008.

The Beckett baronetcy, of Leeds in the County of York, was created in the Baronetage of the United Kingdom on 2 November 1813 for John Beckett. His grandson, the fifth Baronet, was created Baron Grimthorpe in 1886. For more information on this creation, see this title.

The Beckett baronetcy, of Kirkdale Manor in Nawton in the North Riding of the County of York, was created in the Baronetage of the United Kingdom on 28 June 1921 for the newspaper proprietor and Conservative politician Gervase Beckett. He represented Whitby, Scarborough and Whitby and Leeds North in the House of Commons. Beckett was the nephew of the first Baron Grimthorpe and the younger brother of the second Baron.

As of 2008 the baronetcy is held by his grandson, the third Baronet, who succeeded his father in 2001. He is also in remainder to the Beckett Baronetcy of Leeds and the barony of Grimthorpe.

Beckett baronets, of Leeds (1813)
see the Baron Grimthorpe

Beckett baronets, of Kirkdale Manor (1921)

Sir (William) Gervase Beckett, 1st Baronet (1866–1937)
Sir Martyn Gervase Beckett, 2nd Baronet (1918–2001), architect 
Sir Richard Gervase Beckett, 3rd Baronet, QC (b. 1944).

The heir apparent is the present holder's son Walter Gervase Beckett (b. 1987).

See also
Baron Grimthorpe

References
Kidd, Charles, Williamson, David (editors). Debrett's Peerage and Baronetage (1990 edition). New York: St Martin's Press, 1990.

Beckett
Beckett family